Cocculus hirsutus is a tropical, invasive creeper with the common name broom creeper or Patalgarudi (Sanskrit). It is native to India, Pakistan, and tropical Africa.

References

hirsutus
Flora of Africa
Flora of the Indian subcontinent
Flora of Myanmar
Plants described in 1860